Kenneth John Cameron, Baron Cameron of Lochbroom PC FRSE (born 11 June 1931) is a retired Scottish judge who served as Lord Advocate from 1984 to 1989.

Early life
He is the son of John Cameron, Lord Cameron (1900–1996), a Senator of the College of Justice.

Born in Edinburgh, he was educated at Edinburgh Academy, at Corpus Christi College, Oxford and at the University of Edinburgh, where he obtained a PhD in 1971 presenting the thesis "Anti-Corn-Law agitations in Scotland, with particular reference to the Anti-Corn-Law League".

Judicial career
He became an Advocate in 1958 and Queen's Counsel in 1972. He was appointed President of the Pensions Appeal Tribunal for Scotland in 1976, and Chairman of the Committee of Investigation under the Agricultural Marketing Act 1958 in 1980.

Lord Advocate
Cameron was an Advocate Depute from 1981 and was appointed Lord Advocate in 1984, one of the Great Officers of State of Scotland, when he was also created a life peer as Baron Cameron of Lochbroom, of Loch Broom in the District of Ross and Cromarty, and a Privy Counsellor in 1984. He retired from the Lords on 21 April 2016.

Retirement
Lord Cameron of Lochbroom held office as Lord Advocate until 1989 when he was appointed a Senator of the College of Justice.

Other interests
From 1979 to 1983, while still a QC, Cameron served as chairperson of the influential Edinburgh conservationist organisation the Cockburn Association, a position his father Lord Cameron held from 1955 to 1968. In 1996, now as Lord Cameron, he served President of the Cockburn Association until he demitted this office in 2010.

Lord Cameron of Lochbroom was Chairman of the Royal Fine Art Commission for Scotland from 1995 until its abolition in 2005, and is a Fellow of the Royal Society of Edinburgh. He is the current Honorary President of Edinburgh University Sports Union.

Arms

References

Sources
 Who's Who in Scotland, 2009

1931 births
Living people
Lawyers from Edinburgh
Lord Advocates
Cameron of Lochbroom
Senators of the College of Justice
People educated at Edinburgh Academy
Alumni of Corpus Christi College, Oxford
Alumni of the University of Edinburgh
Fellows of Corpus Christi College, Oxford
Fellows of the Royal Society of Edinburgh
Members of the Privy Council of the United Kingdom
Life peers created by Elizabeth II